The Sri Lankan elephant (Elephas maximus maximus) is native to Sri Lanka and one of three recognised subspecies of the Asian elephant. It is the type subspecies of the Asian elephant and was first described by Carl Linnaeus under the binomial Elephas maximus in 1758.
The Sri Lankan elephant population is now largely restricted to the dry zone in the north, east and southeast of Sri Lanka. Elephants are present in Udawalawe National Park, Yala National Park, Lunugamvehera National Park, Wilpattu National Park and Minneriya National Park but also live outside protected areas. It is estimated that Sri Lanka has the highest density of elephants in Asia. Human-elephant conflict is increasing due to conversion of elephant habitat to settlements and permanent cultivation.

Characteristics 

In general, Asian elephants are smaller than African elephants and have the highest body point on the head. The tip of their trunk has one finger-like process. Their back is convex or level. Females are usually smaller than males. Some males have tusks.

Their skin colour is darker than of indicus and of sumatranus with larger and more distinct patches of depigmentation on ears, face, trunk and belly.
Only 7% of males bear tusks. Average adult elephant tusks grow up to about 6 feet. Longest tusks of 7 feet 6 inches long was found in Millangoda Raja (1938-30 July 2011).

The Sri Lankan subspecies designation is weakly supported by analysis of allozyme loci, but not by analysis of mitochondrial DNA (mtDNA) sequences.

In July 2013, a dwarf Sri Lankan elephant was sighted in Udawalawe National Park.

Distribution and habitat 
Sri Lankan elephants are restricted mostly to the lowlands in the dry zone where they are still fairly widespread in north, south, east, north-western, north-central and south-eastern Sri Lanka. A small remnant population exists in the Peak Wilderness Sanctuary. They are absent from the wet zone of the country. Nevertheless, about 65% of the elephant's range extends outside protected areas.

Former range 
In the historical past, elephants were widely distributed from sea level to the highest mountain ranges. They occurred in the dry zone, in the lowland wet zone as well as in the cold damp montane forests. During the colonial period from 1505 to 1948, the wet zone was converted to commercially used fields and became heavily settled. Until 1830, elephants were so plentiful that their destruction was encouraged by the government, and rewards were paid for any that was killed. In the first half of the 19th century, forests in the montane zone were cleared large-scale for the planting of coffee, and afterward tea. The elephant population in the mountains was extirpated.
During the British rule, many bull elephants were killed by trophy hunters. One of the British army majors is credited with having shot over 1,500 elephants, and two others are reputed to have shot half that number each. Many other sportsmen have shot about 250–300 animals during this time. Between 1829 and 1855 alone, more than 6,000 elephants were captured and shot under order of colonial British Empire.

By the turn of the 20th century, elephants were still distributed over much of the island. The area currently known as Ruhuna National Park was the Resident Sportsmen's Shooting Reserve, an area reserved for the sporting pleasure of British residents in the country. In the early 20th century, mega reservoirs were constructed in the dry zone for irrigated agriculture. Ancient irrigation systems were rehabilitated and people resettled. This development gathered momentum after the independence in 1948. As a result, elephant habitat in the dry zone was severely fragmented.

Population trend 
The size of wild elephant populations in Sri Lanka was estimated at

 19,500 in the early 19th century;
 10,000 in the early 20th century;
 7,000 to 8,000 in around 1920;
 between 1,745 and 2,455 individuals in 1969;
 between 2,500 and 3,435 in 1987;
 1,967 in June 1993 that were fragmented in five regions;
 between 3,150 and 4,400 in 2000;
 3,150 in 2006;
 2,900–3,000 in 2007;
 5,879 in 2011, on the basis of counting elephants at water holes in the dry season.
 7,500 in 2019;

Ecology and behaviour 

As generalists, they feed on a wide variety of food plants. In Sri Lanka's northwestern region, feeding behaviour of elephants was observed during the period of January 1998 to December 1999. The elephants fed on a total of 116 plant species belonging to 35 families including 27 species of cultivated plants. More than half of the plants were non-tree species, i.e. shrub, herb, grass, or climbers. More than 25% of the plant species belonged to the family Leguminosae, and 19% of the plant species belonged to the family of true grasses. The presence of cultivated plants in dung does not result solely due to raiding of crops as it was observed that elephants feed on leftover crop plants in fallow chenas. Juvenile elephants tend to feed predominantly on grass species.

Food resources are abundant in regenerating forests, but at low density in mature forests. Traditional slash-and-burn agriculture creates optimum habitat for elephants through promoting successional vegetation.

Females and calves generally form small, loosely associated social groups without the hierarchical tier structure exhibited by African savannah elephants. However, at some locations such as Minneriya National Park, hundreds of individuals aggregate during the dry season, suggesting that grouping behaviour is flexible and depends on season and place.

Like all Asian elephants, the Sri Lankan subspecies communicates using visual, acoustic and chemical signals. At least fourteen different vocal and acoustic signals have been described, which include some low-frequency calls that contain infrasonic frequencies.

Threats 

During the armed conflict in Sri Lanka, elephants were maimed or killed by land mines. Between 1990 and 1994, a total of 261 wild elephants died either as a result of gunshot injuries, or were killed by poachers and land mines. Several elephants stepped on land mines and were crippled.

Today, given the rarity of tuskers in Sri Lanka, poaching for ivory is not a major threat. Nevertheless, some trade in ivory still goes on. Kandy has been identified as the centre for such illegal trade. The greatest threat to elephants comes from an expanding human population and its demand for land. Loss of significant extents of elephant range to development continues currently, with a number of irrigation and development projects leading to the conversion of more elephant ranges to irrigated agriculture and settlements.

Between 1999 and the end of 2006 every year nearly 100 wild elephants were killed. Elephants are killed to protect crops and houses. Other threats are poaching, deforestation, drought and starvation. During drought seasons many elephants damage agricultural land for food. Nearly 80 elephants were killed in north western Sri Lanka, 50 in south and east and another 30 in other parts of the country, totalling 160 elephant deaths in 2006 alone. Sri Lanka has thus become the country with the largest number of elephant fatality per year.

DWC official recode showed that more than 361–405 elephants were killed in 2019.

Conservation 

Elephas maximus is listed on CITES Appendix I.

The elephant conservation strategy of the Department of Wildlife Conservation aims at conserving as many viable populations as possible in as wide a range of suitable habitats as is feasible. This means protecting elephants both within the system of protected areas and as many animals outside these areas that the land can support and landholders will accept, and not restricting elephants to the protected area network alone.

 In the Pinnawala Elephant Orphanage in Kegalle injured elephants are treated, and orphaned baby elephants cared for. Nearly 70 elephants live here. Captive breeding is also going on.
 The Udawalawe Elephant Transit Centre in Udawalawe National Park is a rehabilitation centre, where orphaned elephant calves are being kept until they can be released into the wild.

Cultural and symbolism 

Elephants were a common element in Sinhalese and Sri Lankan Tamils heraldry for over two thousand years and remained so through British colonial rule. The coat of arms and the flag of Ceylon Government from 1875 to 1948 included an elephant and even today many institutions use the Sri Lankan elephant in their coat of arms and insignia.

An important cultural symbiosis has continued to exist between the elephant and humans for over two thousand years – no religious procession was complete without its retinue of elephants, and many large Buddhist temples and Hindu Temples in Sri Lanka had their own elephants.

Captive elephants 

Since time immemorial, elephants have been domesticated for uses as work elephants and war elephants in Sri Lanka by the ancient kings. Elephants were exported from the island for hundreds of years and into the Portuguese and Dutch colonial era. The British did not export elephants, instead took to hunting wild elephants and capture of wild for domestication as work elephants continued. Elephant Kraals were organised to capture large herds of elephants in the late nineteenth and early twentieth century. The capture of wild elephants were regulated under the Fauna and Flora Protection Ordinance in 1937, with the issuance of permits to capture of wild elephants. This practice stopped following the last Elephant Kraal in 1950 by Sir Francis Molamure. A census of the domesticated elephant population in 1970 indicated 532 elephants among 378 owners, while this number had dropped 344 in 1982. These domesticated elephants were used mainly as work elephants and for cultural pageants, the chief of which is the annual Kandy Esala Perahera. In recent years, the domesticated elephant population has dropped further with the need for their labour dropping widespread use of tractors. However, they remain in use in terrain inaccessible by vehicles for logging and used for tourism. Ownership of elephants are highly prestigious among Singhalese as a status symbol and calls have been made for permission to capture wild elephants or release of orphaned wild elephants in government care to Temples to take part in pageants. Captive breeding in private ownership does not take place due to the long period of unemployability associated with it. Legal reforms pertaining to the captive elephant population was introduced in 2021, just as a landmark case into dozens of calves being stolen from their herds in a ten-year period collapsed with the Attorney General's Department dropping charges and releasing the elephants to their former owners.

See also 
 Sri Lankan ivories
 List of mammals of Sri Lanka

References

External links 

Endemic fauna of Sri Lanka
Mammals of Sri Lanka
Elephants
Articles containing video clips